Johan Tommy Karlsson (born April 10, 1976 in Hässleholm) is a Swedish techno/electropop artist who uses the alias Familjen ("The Family").

Biography
Karlsson grew up in Hässleholm, Skåne (the same town as fellow electronica producers Andreas Tilliander and Stefan Thor (Folie)), but is currently based in Malmö. In his youth as a synthpop fan he also formed bands with Sophie Rimheden from nearby Bjärnum and joined the industrial act Morticians with Stefan Thor and Andreas Rimheden. Karlsson has previously produced Swedish indie band David & the Citizens.

Karlsson describes his music as indie-techno:

"I'm pretty fed up with guitar - Indie and techno can get a bit monotone after a while."

All his lyrics are in Swedish, or the southern dialect of Scanian to be more precise. He performs live with Andreas Tilliander on synthesizer.

Both the album and the single Det snurrar i min skalle are released on Tellé in Norway, the same label as Röyksopp, Annie and Kings Of Convenience. Creative Vibes Recordings released the album in Australia in 2008.

In October 2007 Familjen won the Swedish web-based music competition Rampmusic (competitions were also held in Norway and Denmark). Some unexpected help came from the file sharing community The Pirate Bay, who on their website encouraged their visitors to vote for him (without Karlsson's knowledge).

Both music videos directed by Karlsson feature a previously shown image overlaid with a hand-drawn heart for the last few seconds.

In 2015 he produced the ...Baby One More Time-single by the Swedish singer Tove Styrke, a cover of Britney Spears's hit song released in 1998.

Discography

Albums 
 2007: Det snurrar i min skalle
 2008: Huvudet i sanden
 2010: Mänskligheten
 2012: Allt På Rött
 2018: Kom

EP 
 2006: Familjen EP on Adrian Recordings

Singles 
 2006: "Första/Sista" on Adrian Recordings
 2006: "Hög luft" on Adrian Recordings / Hybris
 2007: "Kom säger dom" on Adrian Recordings / Hybris
 2007: "Det snurrar i min skalle" on Adrian Recordings / Hybris / A:Larm (Denmark) / Tellé (Norway) / Creative Vibes (Australia)
 2007: "Huvudet i sanden" on Adrian Recordings / Hybris / Tellé
 2010: "När planeterna stannat" on Adrian Recordings / Hybris

Others
 2014: Göra slut med gud (from Så mycket bättre - Season 5 - Ola Salo Day)
 2014: Regn hos mig (from Så mycket bättre - Season 5 - Orup Day)

Videos 
 2007: "Det snurrar i min skalle" (English translation: "My mind is spinning") Directed by Johan Söderberg. The video was named by Pitchfork Media as one of the best videos of 2007. It also won a grammy in Sweden for best video.
 2007: "Huvudet i sanden" (English translation: "Head in the sand") Directed by Johan Söderberg. Pitchfork Media said the video was "one of the most inspired and rewatchable videos of 2007".
 2010: "Det var jag" (English translation: "It was me") Directed by Mats Udd. Nominated to the best Scandinavian music video by the Bergen International Film Festival in Norway.
 2012: "Vi va dom" Directed by Mats Udd.

See also 
 Andreas Tilliander
 Sophie Rimheden

References

External links
 Official website
 Old official website
 MySpace page
 Adrian Recordings
 Hybris
 Tellé
 Short interview in Swedish on Dagens Nyheter

Swedish electronic music groups
Swedish indie rock groups
Swedish-language singers